Barry Brown (c. 1962, Jamaica — 29 May 2004) was a Jamaican reggae singer, initially coming to prominence in the 1970s with his work with Bunny Lee, but remaining popular throughout his career.

Biography
Barry Brown was one of a number of singers to find success in the 1970s under record producer Bunny Lee.  After forming a short-lived group called The Aliens with Rod Taylor and Johnny Lee, Brown went solo. Although his first release, "Girl You're Always on My Mind", had little impact, his vocal style soon found popularity, with his first hit single coming with 1979's "Step It Up Youthman", which led to an album of the same name on Paradise Records. One of the most successful artists of the early dancehall era, Brown worked with some of Jamaica's top producers of the time, including Linval Thompson, Winston "Niney The Observer" Holness, Sugar Minott and Coxsone Dodd, as well as releasing self-produced material. He recorded for Studio One in 1983, including Far East. After releasing eleven albums between 1979 and 1984, Brown's releases became more sporadic, although his work continued to feature prominently on sound systems such as those of Jah Shaka.

In the 1990s, Brown's health deteriorated, suffering with asthma and substance abuse problems, and he died in May 2004 in Sone Waves recording studio in Kingston, Jamaica, after falling and hitting his head.

Discography
Stand Firm (1978), Justice
Step It Up Youthman (1979), Paradise
Cool Pon Your Corner (1979), Trojan
Superstar (1979), Striker Lee/Jackpot
I'm Not So Lucky (1980), Black Roots
Prince Jammy Presents Barry Brown Showcase (1980), Jammy's/Micron
Showcase (1980), Third World
Artist of the 80's (1980), TR International
Vibes of Barry Brown (1981), Gorgon
Far East (1982), Channel One
Barry (1982), Vista Sounds – reissued as The Best of Barry Brown (1995), JA Classics
I'm Still Waiting (1983), Rocktone Records
Showdown Vol 1 (1984), Empire/Hitbound – with Little John
Roots & Culture (1984), Uptempo – with Willi Williams
Right Now (1984), Time
More Vibes Of Barry Brown Along With Stama Rank (1986), King Culture – with Stama Rank
Same Sound (1990)
Reggae Heights (2003), Mafia & Fluxy

Compilations
The Best Of Barry Brown (1984), Culture Press
Barry Brown, Thompson Sound
Mr Moneyman (1991), Lagoon
Barry Brown & Johnny Clarke Sings Roots & Culture (1992), Fatman – with Johnny Clarke
Love & Protection (1998), Prestige
Showcase : Midnight Rock at Channel One (1999), Abraham
Barry Brown Meets Cornell Campbell (2000), Culture Press
Platinum – the Greatest Hits (2001)
Roots And Culture (2002), Studio One
Roots Ina Greenwich Farm (2002), Cactus – with Johnny Clarke
Steppin Up Dub Wise (2003), Jamaican Recordings
Rich Man Poor Man (2003), Moll Selekta
At King Tubbys Studio (2007), Attack
Barry Brown in Dub (2010), Black Arrow

References

External links
Album discography from Roots Archives
Biography at Dancehallcrew.com

Jamaican reggae singers
1962 births
2004 deaths
Musicians from Kingston, Jamaica
20th-century  Jamaican male singers